Robert Charles Swartelé (22 June 1900 – 7 November 1967) was a Belgian rower. He competed at the 1924 Summer Olympics in Paris with the men's eight where they were eliminated in the round one repechage.

References

1900 births
1967 deaths
Belgian male rowers
Olympic rowers of Belgium
Rowers at the 1924 Summer Olympics
Rowers from Ghent
European Rowing Championships medalists
20th-century Belgian people